Banco Gallego, S.A. was a Spanish bank based in Santiago de Compostela, Galicia. Operating primarily in the region of Galicia the bank had branches throughout Spain. On the April 17, 2013 Banco Gallego was sold to Banco Sabadell for the symbolic sum of 1 euro and was integrated in Banco Sabadell at the beginning of 2014.

History

Bailout
On March 15, 2013 Banco Gallego was effectively nationalized when a share offer organized by the bank was only taken up by Fund for Orderly Bank Restructuring and some small investors. The Spanish government invested 80 million euros into the bank with a controlling stake of 99.95%.

Sale
The nationalised bank was then auctioned off, with offers tabled by Banco Sabadell, Banco Espírito Santo (Portugal) and Banesco (Venezuela).

References

External links
 Official Banco Gallego website—
 Banco Gallego, S.A. — Comisión Nacional del Mercado de Valores

1991 establishments in Galicia (Spain)
2014 disestablishments in Galicia (Spain)
Banco Sabadell
Banks established in 1991
Banks disestablished in 2014
Defunct banks of Spain
Companies based in Galicia (Spain)
Santiago de Compostela
Spanish companies established in 1991